"Sheriff Fatman" is a single by Carter the Unstoppable Sex Machine, released in 1989, and featuring on the album 101 Damnations. The track is probably their best-known original composition. The lyrics rail against slum landlords and their intimidatory tactics used against tenants, and include references to Nicholas van Hoogstraten (referred to as "Nicholas van what's his face") and Peter Rachman, as well as Nazi war criminal Klaus Barbie. "Sheriff Fatman" featured on the influential 1990 Madchester compilation album Happy Daze.

Track listings
CD USMCD1 12" VINYL ABB100T
"Sheriff Fatman"
"R.S.P.C.E."
"Twin Tub With Guitar"
"Everybody's Happy Nowadays" (Pete Shelley)

Charts

References

External links
Lyrics and chords

1989 singles
1989 songs
Carter the Unstoppable Sex Machine songs
Songs about landlords